Marie-Hélène Dozo is a film editor with more than forty film credits. Her editing credits include La Promesse (1996), Rosetta (1999), Murderous Maids (2000), The Son (2002), My Queen Karo (2009), A Screaming Man (2010) and The Ditch (2010). Dozo received the Magritte Award for Best Editing for her work in the 2012 film Kinshasa Kids.

Filmography

References

External links

Belgian film editors
Living people
Magritte Award winners
Year of birth missing (living people)
Place of birth missing (living people)